Danur (English: Danur: I Can See Ghosts) is a 2017 Indonesian horror film directed by Awi Suryadi and written by Lele Laila, starring Prilly Latuconsina, Shareefa Daanish, Wesley Andrew in lead roles. The film story is adapted from a novel written by Risa Saraswati-based friendship between ghosts and humans. It is the highest-grossing Indonesian horror movie at the time, and has led to two sequels, Danur 2: Maddah and Danur 3: Sunyaruri. Three spin-offs are also released Asih (2018), Silam (2018), Asih 2 (2020) and Ivanna (2022).

Plot 
Risa Saraswati is a girl who lives with her rich and busy mother Elly, who works as a teacher. Her father, meanwhile, works overseas, and only visits once every six months. She is displayed as an introvert due to the miserable broken home she lives in. Her mother did not celebrate her eighth birthday, thus she celebrates it herself, wishing new friends to end her lonely state of her childhood. Suddenly, she hears a boy singing "Boneka Abdi", a Sundanese song that is claimed to be invitation for ghosts. She then sees a group of Indonesian-speaking Dutch kids: Peter, Janshen, William, and Hans. The kids, apparitions of their living selves who died during the Japanese occupation of the Dutch East Indies, can only be seen by Risa. Upon request by Elly, the  shamanist Asep explains to Risa that her ability is due to another ability on being able to smell danur, odor of the dead. Gaslighted, she sees the kids in their dead forms, scaring her and prompting her to forget about them.

17-year-old Risa goes back to her childhood house with her little sister Riri and cousin Andri, assigned by Elly, now overseas, to take care of her dying grandma until a nurse arrives. Whilst playing around the house, Riri discovers a ficus tree once warned to Risa by the kids to never approach it. That night, nurse Asih arrives at the house, and Risa started feeling suspicious towards her, especially of the fact that she can get along with Riri instantly. Andri says that he is unable to see Asih, concluding that Asih is a ghost. Amidst a supernatural sabotage, Asih kidnaps Riri, as well as attacking Risa's grandma and Andri, knocking them unconscious. Risa calls Elly and reports Asih's malice. She later plays "Boneka Abdi" on her dusty piano, bringing the kids back, who travel with Risa to the spiritual universe, where Asih drowns Riri in the bathtub. Simultaneously, Elly meets Asep, who tells her that Asih was a woman who committed suicide after killing her newborn baby produced through zina. Asih's spirit roams around the world, searching for children that can replace her murdered child. By placing Asih's comb in the ficus tree and stabbing its roots, Risa and the kids succeed in rescuing Riri.

The next day, everyone moved away from the house, however Risa insists that she will never forget her ghost friends. Later, a girl found Asih's comb, and it is hinted that Asih's spirit is reawakened.

Cast 
 Prilly Latuconsina as Risa
 Sandrinna Michelle Skornicki as Riri
 Shareefa Daanish as Asih
 Asha Kenyeri Bermudez as Little Risa
 Indra Brotolaras as Andri
 Kinaryosih as Ely/Mother
 Inggrid Widjanarko as Nenek/Grandma
 Wesley Andrew as William
 Kevin Bzezovski Taroreh as Janshen Boek
 Gamaharitz as Peter
 Fuad Idris as Ujang
 Aline Adita as Psychologist
 Jose Rizal Manua as Mr. Asep

Awards and nominations

References

External links 
 
 

Indonesian supernatural horror films
2017 films
2017 horror films
Indonesian ghost films
2010s ghost films
Films directed by Awi Suryadi